Coldenhoff is a Dutch surname. Notable people with the surname include:

Glenn Coldenhoff (born 1991), Dutch motocross racer
Louise Elisabeth Coldenhoff (1935–2021), Indonesian naval officer

Dutch-language surnames